Jonathan Bailey House can refer to:

 Jonathan Bailey House (Whittier, California), listed on the National Register of Historic Places in Los Angeles County, California
Jonathan Bailey House (Milo, New York), listed on the National Register of Historic Places in Yates County, New York

See also
 Jonathan Bailey (disambiguation)
 Bailey House (disambiguation)